Ettadhamen is a municipality part of the Aryanah governorate attached to the agglomeration of Tunis. It resulted from the split in 2016 of the municipality of Ettadhamen-Mnihla with the creation of a separate municipality in Mnihla.

This popular city, whose name means "solidarity", was created in the 1950s with the arrival of populations from internal migration. A former district built illegally, it was then integrated into the urban plan of the Tunisian agglomeration.

History 
Ettadhamen was formed by the waves of internal migration (poor, small farmers and unemployed) that marked Tunisia in the early 1950s, during the presidency of Habib Bourguiba, when hundreds of families left their poor villages in the northwestern governorates (Siliana, Beja, Jendouba and Le Kef)  for the suburbs of the capital.

The neighborhood's youth played a central role in the 2011 revolution which overthrew President Zine el-Abidine Ben Ali because they aspired to change their difficult living conditions, but without success. If traces of the main contributors to the popular uprising are still present on the walls of the houses and surrounding alleys, infrastructure projects in fact remain absent in the region till this day, which contributed to the deterioration of the situation and the spread of crime, with drug trafficking and a high level of frustration and deprivation among young people, most of whom choose illegal migration. Militant Islamist movements are also developing and certain jihadist cells are emerging, especially among the youth.

Before Ettadhamen-Mnihla split into two separate municipalities (Ettadhamen and Mnihla) in 2016, the complex was inhabited by nearly 142,953 people (2014).

Economy 
The political transition of the Tunisian state after the 2011 revolution contributed to the state of economic stagnation, with an increase in the number of university graduates and an absence of a comprehensive strategy offering radical solutions to reduce the unemployment rate. This is estimated at more than 60%, while the poverty rate is 70%, because the monthly income of thousands of families does not exceed 200 dinars, while it reached 27.88% for higher graduates in 2014.

Culture

Youth centers 
Ettadhamen is equipped with a multidisciplinary complex whose mission is to train young people and develop their talents in a number of fields, such as music, theater and reading. It was inaugurated by President Béji Caïd Essebsi in 2018.

Summer festivals 
The district has its own festival which is held annually from the end of July to the first week of August. In 2019, the local community celebrated the 33rd edition of the festival which is considered one of the few entertainment events available. The festival brings together activities of all types, but above all concerts and sometimes plays.

Sport 
According to a study carried out by a group of sociologists on young people from Douar Hicher and Ettadhamen, 55% of active associations are focusing on sports while are 18.5% non-profit, 10.3% are cultural and 10.5% religious. This study states that only one in four young people know at least one active association in their neighborhood.

Sports clubs perform their activities in the indoor hall at the 14th of January hall or at the municipal stadium. The first one was built in 2003 at a cost of 850,000 dinars, hosts wrestling, weightlifting and boxing trainings and competitions while the second was completed in 1989 for an investment of 120,000 dinars and renovated in 2008 at a cost of 150,000 dinars. This reflects the strategy that the various governments follow to encourage local sporting activities and invest in the human potential of the population.

Personalities 

 Ghofrane Belkhir: weightlifter, medalist at the 2016 and 2017 African Championships, the 2018 Mediterranean Games and the 2018 Youth Olympic Games;
 Makrem Grami: technical director of the Tunisian Boxing Federation;
 Amira Tlili: initiator of the first coffee project for women in Tunisia.

References 

Tunis
Populated places in Ariana Governorate